Elizabeth Divov (Russian: Елизавета Петровна Дивова; 1762-1813), born countess Buturlina was a Russian Empire courtier. She served as lady-in-waiting to empress Catherine the Great, and was married in 1784 to Adrian Divov. In 1784 she was suspected to be behind a controversial political satire.

In 1792, Divov visited Sweden with her husband, and became known for her involvement in political plots during her stay. Her house in St. Petersburg, called Little Koblenz, was known as a haven for French émigrés.

References 
 Русские портреты XVIII—XIX столетий. Изд. Вел. Кн. Николая Михайловича. СПб. 1906. Т. II вып III. No. 62.

1762 births
1813 deaths
Ladies-in-waiting from the Russian Empire